Australia competed at the 2016 Winter Youth Olympics in Lillehammer, Norway from 12 to 21 February 2016.

Medalists

Medalists in mixed NOCs events

Alpine skiing

Boys

Girls

Biathlon

Boys

Girls

Mixed

Cross-country skiing

Boys

Girls

Freestyle skiing

Halfpipe

Ski cross

Slopestyle

Ice hockey

Luge

Short track speed skating

Girls

Mixed team relay

Qualification Legend: FA=Final A (medal); FB=Final B (non-medal); FC=Final C (non-medal); FD=Final D (non-medal); SA/B=Semifinals A/B; SC/D=Semifinals C/D; ADV=Advanced to Next Round; PEN=Penalized

Snowboarding

Halfpipe

Snowboard cross

Slopestyle

Snowboard and ski cross relay

Qualification legend: FA – Qualify to medal round; FB – Qualify to consolation round

See also
Australia at the 2016 Summer Olympics

References

Nations at the 2016 Winter Youth Olympics
Australia at the Youth Olympics
2016 in Australian sport